A force-sensing resistor is a material whose resistance changes when a force, pressure or mechanical stress is applied.  They are also known as force-sensitive resistor and are sometimes referred to by the initialism FSR.

History 
The technology of force-sensing resistors was invented and patented in 1977 by Franklin Eventoff. In 1985 Eventoff founded Interlink Electronics, a company based on his force-sensing-resistor (FSR). In 1987, Eventoff was the recipient of the prestigious international IR 100 award for the development of the FSR. In 2001 Eventoff founded a new company, Sensitronics, that he currently runs.

Properties 
Force-sensing resistors consist of a conductive polymer, which changes resistance in a predictable manner following application of force to its surface.  They are normally supplied as a polymer sheet or ink that can be applied by screen printing.  The sensing film consists of both electrically conducting and non-conducting particles suspended in matrix. The particles are sub-micrometre sizes, and are formulated to reduce the temperature dependence, improve mechanical properties and increase surface durability.  Applying a force to the surface of the sensing film causes particles to touch the conducting electrodes, changing the resistance of the film. As with all resistive based sensors, force-sensing resistors require a relatively simple interface and can operate satisfactorily in moderately hostile environments. Compared to other force sensors, the advantages of FSRs are their size (thickness typically less than 0.5 mm), low cost and good shock resistance. A disadvantage is their low precision: measurement results may differ 10% and more.   Force-sensing capacitors offer superior sensitivity and long term stability, but require more complicated drive electronics.

Operation principle of FSRs 
There are two major operation principles in force-sensing resistors: percolation and quantum tunneling. Although both phenomena actually occur simultaneously in the conductive polymer, one phenomenon dominates over the other depending on particle concentration. Particle concentration is also referred in literature as the filler volume fraction . More recently, new mechanistic explanations have been established to explain the performance of force-sensing resistors; these are based on the property of contact resistance  occurring between the sensor electrodes and the conductive polymer. Specifically the force induced transition from Sharvin contacts to conventional Holm contacts. The contact resistance, plays an important role in the current conduction of force-sensing resistors in a twofold manner. First, for a given applied stress , or force , a plastic deformation occurs between the sensor electrodes and the polymer particles thus reducing the contact resistance. Second, the uneven polymer surface is flattened when subjected to incremental forces, and therefore, more contact paths are created; this causes an increment in the effective Area for current conduction . At a macroscopic scale, the polymer surface is smooth. However, under a scanning electron microscope, the conductive polymer is irregular due to agglomerations of the polymeric binder.

Up to date, there is not a comprehensive model capable of predicting all the non-linearities observed in force-sensing resistors. The multiple phenomena occurring in the conductive polymer turn out to be too complex such to embrace them all simultaneously; this condition is typical of systems encompassed within condensed matter physics. However, in most cases, the experimental behavior of force-sensing resistors can be grossly approximated to either the percolation theory or to the equations governing quantum tunneling through a rectangular potential barrier.

Percolation in FSRs 
The percolation phenomenon dominates in the conductive polymer when the particle concentration is above the percolation threshold . A force-sensing resistor operating on the basis of percolation exhibits a positive coefficient of pressure, and therefore, an increment in the applied pressure causes an increment in the electrical resistance , For a given applied stress , the electrical resistivity  of the conductive polymer can be computed from:

Under percolation regime, the particles are separated from each other when mechanical stress is applied, this causes a net increment in the device's resistance.

Quantum tunneling in FSRs 
Quantum tunneling is the most common operation mode of force-sensing resistors. A conductive polymer operating on the basis of quantum tunneling exhibits a resistance decrement for incremental values of stress . Commercial FSRs such as the FlexiForce, Interlink  and Peratech  sensors operate on the basis of quantum tunneling. The Peratech sensors are also referred to in the literature as quantum tunnelling composite.

The quantum tunneling operation implies that the average inter-particle separation  is reduced when the conductive polymer is subjected to mechanical stress, such a reduction in  causes a probability increment for particle transmission according to the equations for a rectangular potential barrier. Similarly, the contact resistance  is reduced amid larger applied forces. In order to operate on the basis of quantum tunneling, particle concentration in the conductive polymer must be held below the percolation threshold .

Several authors have developed theoretical models for the quantum tunneling conduction of FSRs, some of the models rely upon the equations for particle transmission across a rectangular potential barrier. However, the practical usage of such equations is limited because they are stated in terms of electron energy, that follows a Fermi Dirac probability distribution, i.e. electron energy is not a priori determined or can not be set by the final user. The analytical derivation of the equations for a rectangular potential barrier including the Fermi Dirac distribution was found in the 60`s by Simmons. Such equations relate the current density  with the external applied voltage across the sensor . However,  is not straightforward measurable in practice, so the transformation  is usually applied in literature when dealing with FSRs.

The low voltage equation of the Simmons' model  is fundamental for modeling the current conduction of FSRs. In fact, the most widely accepted model for tunneling conduction has been proposed by Zhang et al. on the basis of such equation. By re-arranging the aforesaid equation, it is possible to obtain an expression for the conductive polymer resistance , where  is given by the quotient  according to the Ohm's law:

When the conductive polymer is fully unloaded, the following relationship can be stated between the inter-particle separation at rest state ,the filler volume fraction  and particle diameter :

Similarly, the following relationship can be stated between the inter-particle separation  and stress 

where  is the  Young's modulus of the conductive polymer. Finally, by combining all the aforementioned equations, the Zhang's model  is obtained as next:

Although the model from Zhang et al. has been widely accepted by many authors, it has been unable to predict some experimental observations reported in force-sensing resistors. Probably, the most challenging phenomenon to predict is sensitivity degradation. When subjected to dynamic loading, some force-sensing resistors exhibit degradation in sensitivity. Up to date, a physical explanation for such a phenomenon has not been provided, but experimental observations and more complex modeling from some authors have demonstrated that sensitivity degradation is a voltage-related phenomenon that can be avoided by choosing an appropriate driving voltage in the experimental set-up.

The model proposed by Paredes-Madrid et al. uses the entire set of Simmons' equations  and embraces the contact resistance within the model; this implies that the external applied voltage to the sensor  is split between the tunneling voltage  and the voltage drop across the contact resistance  as next:

and the contact resistance  is given by:

When 

When 

When 

This formulation accounts for the increment in the number of conduction paths with stress:

Current research trends in FSRs 
Although the above model  is unable to describe the undesired phenomenon of sensitivity degradation, the inclusion of rheological models has predicted that drift can be reduced by choosing an appropriate sourcing voltage; this statement has been supported by experimental observations. Another approach to reduce drift is to employ Non-aligned electrodes so that the effects of polymer creep are minimized. There is currently a great effort placed on improving the performance of FSRs with multiple different approaches: in-depth modeling of such devices in order to choose the most adequate driving circuit, changing the electrode configuration to minimize drift and/or hysteresis, investigating on new materials type such as carbon nanotubes, or solutions combining the aforesaid methods.

Uses 
Force-sensing resistors are commonly used to create pressure-sensing "buttons" and have applications in many fields, including musical instruments (such as the Sensel Morph), car occupancy sensors, artificial limbs, foot pronation systems, and portable electronics. They are also used in mixed or augmented reality systems as well as to enhance mobile interaction.

See also

 Velostat – used to make hobbyist sensors

References 

Resistive components
Sensors